GLP may refer to:

Political parties 
 Gomantak Lok Pox, in Goa, India
 Gombey Liberation Party, in Bermuda
 Green Liberal Party of Switzerland
 Guyana Labour Party

Other uses 
 GLP (company), real estate, Singapore
 Guadeloupe ISO 3166-1 alpha-3 code
 G9a-like protein
 Gdynia Literary Prize
 Genetic Literacy Project
 Gibson Les Paul
 German Longhaired Pointer
 Global Land Project
 Globus Airlines, Russia, ICAO code
 Gollaprolu railway station, Andhra Pradesh, India, station code
 Good laboratory practice
 Green Launching Pad, New Hampshire, US
 Japaridze's polymodal logic
 Global Leadership Program at Daewon Foreign Language High School
Glucagon-like peptide, GLP1 & GLP2